Andrew O. McCabe (1945 – 4 December 2021) was an Irish Gaelic footballer who played at club level with Crosserlough and at inter-county level with the Cavan senior football team. He usually lined out as a defender.

Career

McCabe first played Gaelic football with the Crosserlough club. He captained the club's minor team to championship success in 1963, the senior team to league victory in 1964 and two years later in 1966 he captained the Crosserlough senior team to the first of their seven-in-a-row run of championship victories. McCabe joined the Cavan senior football team during the 1966-67 National League, having spent a number of seasons with the Cavan junior team. He won Ulster Championship medals in 1967 and again in 1969 as Cavan defeated Down on both occasions. McCabe's displays for Cavan earned him a call up to the Ulster panel and he was a key player for a number of years, winning Railway Cup medals in 1970 and 1971.

Death

McCabe died on 4 December 2021.

Honours

Crosserlough
Cavan Senior Football Championship: 1966 (c), 1967, 1968, 1969, 1970, 1971, 1972

Cavan
Ulster Senior Football Championship: 1967, 1969

Ulster
Railway Cup: 1970, 1971

References

1945 births
2021 deaths
Crosserlough Gaelic footballers
Cavan inter-county Gaelic footballers
Irish salespeople
Ulster inter-provincial Gaelic footballers